Dr. John Van Nostrand Dorr (1872–1962) was an industrial chemist active in early to middle twentieth century. He was born in 1872 in Newark, New Jersey.  He worked with Thomas Edison before attending Rutgers University, from which he obtained a B.S. in chemistry in 1894.

His major contribution in the field of chemical engineering was the development of the Dorr classifier which became a practical method for the separation and chemical treatment of fine solids suspended in liquid. This technology was used in sewage treatment, water purification, de-silting projects, minerals milling, and sugar production. He founded the Dorr Company in 1916.

In the early 1950s, Dorr postulated that at night and when rain, snow or fog impaired vision, drivers hugged the white lines painted in the middle of highways. Dorr believed this led to numerous accidents and that painting a white line along the outside shoulders of the highways would save lives. Dorr convinced highway engineers in Westchester County, New York, to test his theory along a stretch of highway with curves and gradients. The decrease in accidents was dramatic and a follow-up test in Connecticut had similar results. Dorr then used his own foundation to publicize the demonstration's results.

Dorr was awarded the Franklin Institute's John Scott Medal in 1916, the Chemical Industry Medal in 1938, and the Perkin Medal by the Society of Chemical Industry in 1941. He was the benefactor of several major philanthropies, as well as founding his own charity, the Dorr Foundation.

References

1872 births
1962 deaths
Rutgers University alumni
American chemical engineers